Geoffrey Corrigan (born 23 July 1953) is a former Australian politician with the Labor Party member of the New South Wales Legislative Assembly in the seat of Camden.

Corrigan was elected the member for the Camden in 2003, in a close-run election after the retirement of Liz Kernohan.  He defeated Liberal candidate Paul Masina and independent Eva Campbell; both he and Campbell were former mayors of Camden. Corrigan was re-elected in March 2007, defeating Liberal candidate Camden mayor Chris Patterson. Corrigan was defeated by Patterson in the 2011 election.

Notes

 

1953 births
Living people
Members of the New South Wales Legislative Assembly
Place of birth missing (living people)
Australian Labor Party members of the Parliament of New South Wales
21st-century Australian politicians